Dorothy Davies may refer to:

Dorothy Davies (pianist), New Zealand pianist and piano teacher
Dorothy Davies, American film actress in Night Fright
Dorothy Davies, Canadian television actress in The Manipulators

See also
Dorothy Davis (disambiguation)